Mehedi Hasan (born 20 January 2002) is a Bangladeshi cricketer. He made his Twenty20 debut for Brothers Union in the 2018–19 Dhaka Premier Division Twenty20 Cricket League on 25 February 2019. He made his List A debut for Brothers Union in the 2018–19 Dhaka Premier Division Cricket League on 8 March 2019. He made his first-class debut on 10 October 2019, for Chittagong Division in the 2019–20 National Cricket League.

References

External links
 

2002 births
Living people
Bangladeshi cricketers
Brothers Union cricketers
Chittagong Division cricketers
Place of birth missing (living people)